Eagle Newspapers is composed of six community newspapers and several niche publications serving Syracuse, New York and Central New York.

Ownership

Owned by Community Media Group LLC, Eagle Newspapers includes the Baldwinsville Messenger, Eagle Star-Review (Liverpool, Clay, North Syracuse, Cicero, Salina), Cazenovia Republican, Skaneateles Press, Eagle Bulletin (Manlius, Fayetteville, DeWitt, Jamesville, Minoa, East Syracuse), Eagle Observer (Camillus, Marcellus, Jordan, Elbridge), Syracuse Parent, Syracuse Prime, Syracuse Woman Magazine, Excellence and the CNY Employment Guide. The award-winning weekly newspapers are available for home delivery, or can be purchased in their home communities at retail outlets. Syracuse Parent, CNY Employment and several other niche publications are available for free at hundreds of locations in and around Syracuse.

History
Eagle Newspapers was founded in 1992, joining two long-serving publishers, Manlius Publishing and Brown Newspapers, and bringing hundreds of years worth of publishing excellence together. Eagle Newspapers made its home in Baldwinsville until 1996, when it moved its headquarters and printing facilities to Firestone Drive in DeWitt, New York

Since that time, Eagle Newspapers has launched the Oneida Press, Solvay-Geddes Express and Syracuse City Eagle publications, which are available free throughout their respective communities. The Oneida Press, Solvay-Geddes Express and a few other newspapers were discontinued in the mid-2000s.

In 1998, Eagle Newspapers purchased Spotlight Newspapers in Albany, a group of 10 suburban weeklies. In addition, Eagle's main office in Syracuse is the home of Empire Media, which publishes the statewide-distributed Empire Monthly and Empire Education publications.

In 2002, Eagle Newspapers launched cnylink.com, an interactive website touting the top news and sports stories from Eagle's 15 weeklies, along with classified ads, entertainment calendar, archives, coupons, blogs, photo galleries and links to government and school websites. Since that time, Eagle has launched seven more online properties, including empiremonthly.com, syracuseparent.net, urbancny.com, spotlightnews.com, cdparentpages.com, capitaldistrictyardsale.com and piratecny.com. To maintain those properties and manage the company's website design services, the company formed a New Media division in 2006.

In October 2009, Eagle Newspapers and Spotlight Newspapers were purchased by Community Media Group LLC. In 2010, Eagle Newspapers re-launched their website under a new name Eagle News Online and opened new offices located in Eastwood. Each newspaper had its own website and Facebook page:

 The Eagle CNY - serving the city of Syracuse (Discontinued in 2012)
 Baldwinsville Messenger - serving Baldwinsville, Lysander and Van Buren
 Cazenovia Republican - serving the town and village of Cazenovia
 Eagle Observer - serving town/village of Camillus, Marcellus, Elbridge and village of Jordan
 Eagle Bulletin - serving Manlius, Fayetteville, Minoa, Kirkville, East Syracuse, DeWitt and Jamesville
 Eagle Star Review - serving Cicero, North Syracuse, Clay and Liverpool. The Clay Insider is also sent exclusively to Clay residents monthly.
 Skaneateles Press - serving Skaneateles and Spafford

Community news
Eagle Newspapers is well known for its concentration on positive community-level news—news closer to local communities than readers can find anywhere else. Eagle Newspapers publications are filled with school announcements, wedding announcements, birth announcements and award-winning coverage of schools, government, sports and human-interest stories. They have also been exclusively covering town, village and school boards bringing hyper-local news to their communities, news that is typically not provided elsewhere.

Awards
Eagle Newspapers has won dozens of awards for journalistic excellence from the New York Press Association and the Syracuse Press Club. Both groups have recognized the strong columns, investigations, feature stories, design, editorials and online excellence that characterize Eagle Newspapers products.

References

External links
Official Eagle Newspapers website

Newspapers published in Syracuse, New York
Newspaper companies of the United States
Privately held companies based in New York (state)
DeWitt, New York